Jessikka Aro (born 19 December 1980) is a Finnish journalist working for Finland's public service broadcaster Yle and an author of a non-fiction book Putin's Trolls. In September 2014, she began to investigate pro-Russian Internet trolls, but became a victim of their activities herself. This harassment led to three people being convicted in October 2018.
In 2019 she was notified that she was to receive an International Women of Courage Award from the U.S. Department of State but this was rescinded just before the ceremony.

Russian trolls
Aro saw the actions of Kremlin-connected internet trolls as "a threat to Finnish people's freedom of speech" telling Deutsche Welle (DW) she "was really astonished to find out that it's quite big—super big actually."

After a visit to St Petersburg to investigate the Internet Research Agency, where she interviewed employees at the troll factory who create fake online accounts and produce fake stories, she encountered a significant backlash from pro-Russian trolls. She has described abusive responses including a phone call from a Ukrainian number with the sound of a machine gun firing on the other end, as well as a cell phone text message purporting to be from her father (who had died 20 years earlier) indicating "he was keeping watch on her". Russian nationalist websites described her as working for the West's security agencies. A vocal critic was Johan Bäckman, who made false claims about her assisting the Estonian and United States security services. Aro told Foreign Policy magazine: "The goal of these campaigns is to discredit the voices in Finland that are critical of Russia." Her series of articles led to Aro receiving Bonnier's Award for Journalism in March 2016.

Officials with the European Union told the Sydney Morning Herald it was an escalation of Russian "information warfare" against the West. In 2016, Aro published an article in the journal of the centre-right European Peoples Party describing the "brutal" harassment that she attributes to Russian trolls. This behaviour includes doxing such as revealing her conviction for drug possession when she was 20, which was turned into a false claim she is a "NATO drug dealer".

Rescinded US award

Aro told Foreign Policy that the US State Department had informed her in January 2019 that she would be one of the winners of the 2019 International Women of Courage Awards. The notification, described as a "regrettable error" by a State Department representative, was rescinded shortly before the award ceremony. According to Aro and U.S. officials familiar with the internal deliberations, the award was rescinded after U.S. officials reviewed Aro's social media posts and found she had criticized President Donald Trump. A US State Department spokesperson did not respond to questions on the identity of the decision maker or the reasons for the decision. The relevant award was presented to Sri Lanka's Marini De Livera instead. An editorial in The Washington Post commented: "Ms. Aro deserved the award. She should hold her head high for courage, unlike those who denied her the honor." The United States Senate Committee on Foreign Relations requested an investigation by the Office of the Inspector General of the Department of State, and in September 2020, the Inspector General concluded that the State Department provided a false explanation for rescinding the award.

Pro-Russian assailants convicted
In October 2018, the Helsinki District Court found , Johan Bäckman and a woman guilty of sustained defamation against Aro. The final judgement said the two men had committed "an exceptionally aggravated set of crimes". Janitskin, the founder of the MV-Lehti website was sentenced to 22 months in jail on 16 criminal counts while Bäckman received a year's suspended jail sentence for aggravated defamation and stalking. They were required to pay damages to Aro and other plaintiffs in the case. The New York Times called this "the first time that a European country had taken action against pro-Russian disinformation spread through social media, websites and news outlets controlled by or linked to Russia". Bäckman described his conviction as "another dirty trick by NATO."

See also
Russian web brigades

References

External links
 Jessikka Aro's prize-winning stories on Russian propaganda (Yle Kioski selection of articles in English, Finnish and Russian)

1980 births
Living people
21st-century Finnish journalists
Finnish women journalists